Zahiya Zareer, Dhivehi: ޒާހިޔާ ޒަރީރު (born 30 December 1959) is a Maldivian politician and former teacher; she is Ambassador-at-Large at the Ministry of Foreign Affairs of the Government of the Maldives and was formerly High Commissioner to Sri Lanka, after held two ministerial government offices.

Career 

Zareer began work in 1983, working for the Maldivian government. Her first role was as an English language teacher, from which she worked to become the Minister of Education from 2005 to 2008. From 2004 to 2005 she held the post of Minister of Gender, Family Development & Social Security. During her time as Minister for Education, almost half of Maldivian teachers went on strike. She also established Teacher Resource Centres, which were designed to enable a greater number of teachers to access professional development for child-centred active learning.

On 13 February 2014, Zareer was appointed by President Abdulla Yameen as High Commissioner to Sri Lanka. She presented her credentials to the President of Sri Lanka in June 2014. During her time in Sri Lanka, the Maldives declared its withdrawal from the Commonwealth. As a result of this move, Zareer's title changed to Ambassador. During her time in Sri Lanka, she was involved in a diplomatic dispute after a 'bomb plot suspect' was expelled from the country. On 13 August 2017, the Maldivian government dismissed her from the post. She was then appointed Ambassador-at-Large at the Ministry of Foreign Affairs of the Government of the Maldives.

Zareer is also an expert in Divehi.

Personal life 
Zareer is married and has one son and one daughter; her hobbies include reading, writing poetry and gardening. Her father was a cabinet minister and her mother worked at the Department of Women’s Affairs.

References 

1959 births
Maldivian politicians
Maldivian diplomats
High Commissioners of the Maldives to Sri Lanka
Women government ministers of the Maldives
Ambassadors of the Maldives
Living people
21st-century Maldivian women politicians
21st-century Maldivian politicians